Lori Reina Goldstein (born May 13, 1975, in the Bronx, New York City, United States) is an American female dance-pop singer-songwriter.

Early life and career
Reina was a backup singer for such music artists as Deborah Cox and Corina. In 1995, she released a self-titled R&B album as Lori Gold, and had a minor hit with "I Likes". In 1998, as Reina, she became an overnight sensation on the Dance/Club scene when "Find Another Woman" reached No. 2 on the Billboard Hot Dance Music/Club Play chart.

In 2003, she scored her biggest hit on the Billboard Hot 100 when her single "No One's Gonna Change You" crossed over from the dance charts. In 2004 when "If I Close My Eyes" went to number 2 on Billboard's Dance/Mix Show Airplay chart, she garnered her biggest dance hit and in 2005 scored another top 5 on the same chart with "Forgive". All 3 tracks were from her third album overall, but first under her new name Reina "This Is Reina". Reina is promoted by AJ Iacona.

Discography

Albums
 1995: Lori Gold; Lori Gold, Cutting Edge
 2004: Reina; This Is Reina, Robbins Entertainment

Singles
"I Likes" (1994) (as Lori Gold)
"Tender Lovin' Care" (1996) (as Lori Gold)
"Find Another Woman" (11/1998)
"Anything For Love" (6/1999)
"Got A Love For You" (Credited as Heaven Featuring Reina; 11/2000)
"Miss the Way" (Credited as Razor N' Guido Featuring Reina; 4/2000)
"Vivo per Lei"(with Angelo Venuto and The Sicilians; 2003)
"No One's Gonna Change You" (2/2003)
"If I Close My Eyes" (4/2004)
"Christmas (Baby Please Come Home)" (11/2004)
"Forgive" (5/2005)
"Love Of My Life" (With Lucas Prata) (4/2006)
"On My Own" (12/2006)
"Just Let Go" (4/2010)
"Forever" (with Sweet Rains; 10/2014)
"Rain On Me" (Unreleased)
"U there?" (Unreleased)

References

External links

Reina on Myspace
Record label (Robbins Entertainment)

1975 births
Living people
American dance musicians
American house musicians
Robbins Entertainment artists
21st-century American singers
21st-century American women singers